Camera calibration may refer to:
Camera resectioning, which is called also geometric camera calibration
Color mapping, which is a method for photometric camera calibration
Radiometric calibration